Cheiracanthium algarvense is a spider species found in Portugal and Spain.

References 

algarvense
Spiders of Europe
Spiders described in 2012